Lucy Shaw (born 17 July 1997) is a British professional racing cyclist, who last rode for UCI Women's Team .

See also
 List of 2016 UCI Women's Teams and riders

References

External links
 

1997 births
Living people
British female cyclists
Place of birth missing (living people)
21st-century British women